The Wildlife Conservation Enactment 1997 is a regional piece of legislation enforced only in the state of Sabah in Malaysian Borneo. Its aim is to protect the endangered species of fauna and flora in the region as well as control international trade of these species.  It also details specific punishments for those that break the rules and regulations put forth in the enactment.

Structure
The Wildlife Conservation Enactment 1997, in its current form (27 April 2016), consists of 12 Parts containing 119 sections and 5 schedules.
 Part I: Preliminary
 Part II: Administration
 Part III: Protected Areas
 Part IV: Protection of Animals and Hunting
 Part V: Possession of and Trade in Animals
 Part VI: Protection of Plants
 Part VII: Utilisation of Wildlife
 Part VIII: Enforcement
 Part IX: Offences
 Part X: Liability of Company Members, Administrative Penalties and Other Penalties
 Part XI: Powers of the Minister
 Part XII: Miscellaneous
 Schedules

External links
 Wildlife Conservation Enactment 1997
 Online edition of Wildlife Conservation Enactment of 1997

1997 in law
Sabah state legislation
Nature conservation in Malaysia
Politics of Sabah
Wildlife law
1997 in Malaysia